Lakatnik is a small village located in Svoge Municipality, near the Lakatnik rocks. The village has a train station called Gara Lakatnik on the train line Sofia - Mezdra located 8 km north of the village. During the years the train station turned into in a separate settlement.

Lakatnik will co-host the Bulgarian National Youth Games in August 2017. The other host villages will be Bov, Gara Bov and Gara Lakatnik. The cycling events will take part in the village.

References

Villages in Sofia Province